Maïchata Konaté (born 1 January 1984), nicknamed Bittar, is a Malian former footballer who played as a striker. She has been a member of the Mali women's national team.

International career
Konaté capped for Mali at senior level during two Africa Women Cup of Nations editions (2002 and 2006).

International goals
Scores and results list Mali's goal tally first

References

1984 births
Living people
Malian women's footballers
Women's association football forwards
Mali women's international footballers
21st-century Malian people